Johannes Arlt (born 23 April 1984) is a German soldier and politician of the Social Democratic Party (SPD) who has been serving as a member of the German Bundestag since the 2021 elections.

Private life and education
From 2019 to 2021 Arlt completed his studies at the Swedish Defence University (FHS) in Stockholm.Since 2019 he is married with a Danish man.

Political career
Arlt has been a Member of the German Bundestag for Mecklenburg Lake District II - Rostock District III in Mecklenburg-Western Pomerania as of the 2021 German federal election. He has since been serving on the Defence Committee and the Committee on Economic Affairs.

Private life

References 

1984 births
Living people
Members of the Bundestag for the Social Democratic Party of Germany
Members of the Bundestag for Mecklenburg-Western Pomerania
Members of the Bundestag 2021–2025
Politicians from Berlin
LGBT members of the Bundestag
German LGBT politicians
Gay politicians